Thor Olsen (1 December 1929 – 4 June 2014) was a Norwegian weightlifter. He competed in the men's middleweight event at the 1952 Summer Olympics.

References

1929 births
2014 deaths
Norwegian male weightlifters
Olympic weightlifters of Norway
Weightlifters at the 1952 Summer Olympics
Sportspeople from Trondheim
20th-century Norwegian people